Ronald Raldes Balcázar (born April 20, 1981) is a Bolivian former professional footballer who played as a centre-back. He is the first Bolivian player in history to reach 100 international appearances.

Club career
Raldes was born in Santa Cruz de la Sierra. He started his career with Club Destroyers in 1998, the following year he joined Oriente Petrolero, where he was part of the Bolivian League Championship winning team in 2001.

Due to his high performance displayed with Oriente Petrolero and the Bolivia national team, Raldes was signed by Argentine club Rosario Central in 2003.

In 2008, and after five great years with the canallas, Raldes announced his imminent departure from the institution once the Torneo Clausura ended in mid June. Not long after, he signed for Saudi Arabian club Al-Hilal. On March 20, 2009, he joined Mexican side Cruz Azul. He made his debut on April 22, 2009, against Atlante, in the first-leg match of the CONCACAF Champions League finals. After only making two appearances for the cementeros, Raldes decided to let go the contract with Cruz Azul and signed with Israeli football club Maccabi Tel Aviv in September 2009.
In May 2010, Raldes returned to Argentina and joined Colón de Santa Fe on a two-year deal. On January 25, 2012, while doing the pre-season with Colón, Raldes fractured his left fibula bone during a friendly match against Patronato causing him to miss the entire Clausura tournament.

In November 2013, Raldes left Colón due to the club's failure to pay his wages. He was signed by Oriente Petrolero, on January 9, 2014.

International career
Since Raldes debuted for the Bolivia national team in 2001 he has appeared for the nation at five Copa América tournaments.

On 18 November 2014, he scored his first international goal in a 3–2 friendly home win over Venezuela.

Raldes was captain of the Bolivian squad for the 2015 Copa América in Chile. On 15 June, he scored in the team's second group match – a 3–2 defeat of Ecuador – to give La Verde its first win at the Copa América since the 1997 tournament.

On September 11, 2015, Raldes announced his retirement from the national team, but returned in 2016 after Guillermo Ángel Hoyos replaced Julio César Baldivieso. He represented his country in 44 FIFA World Cup qualification matches.

On May 28, 2018, he reached 100 games with Bolivia, which was defeated 3–0 by the United States in an international friendly.

Career statistics

International
Scores and results list Bolivia's goal tally first.

Honours
Oriente Petrolero
 Liga de Fútbol Profesional Boliviano: 2001

Bolívar
 Liga de Fútbol Profesional Boliviano: 2017 Apertura, 2017 Clausura

See also
 List of footballers with 100 or more caps

References

External links
 Argentine Primera statistics at Fútbol XXI  
 Ronald Raldes profile at Football Lineups
 
 
 

1981 births
Living people
Sportspeople from Santa Cruz de la Sierra
Bolivian footballers
Bolivia international footballers
Bolivian expatriate footballers
Association football central defenders
Club Destroyers players
Oriente Petrolero players
Rosario Central footballers
Al Hilal SFC players
Cruz Azul footballers
Maccabi Tel Aviv F.C. players
Club Atlético Colón footballers
Club Bolívar players
2001 Copa América players
2004 Copa América players
2007 Copa América players
2011 Copa América players
2015 Copa América players
Liga MX players
Argentine Primera División players
Expatriate footballers in Argentina
Expatriate footballers in Mexico
Israeli Premier League players
Expatriate footballers in Israel
Expatriate footballers in Saudi Arabia
Saudi Professional League players
FIFA Century Club